Wood's metal, also known as Lipowitz's alloy or by the commercial names Cerrobend, Bendalloy, Pewtalloy and MCP 158, is a metal alloy that is useful for soldering and making custom metal parts, but which is toxic to touch or breathe vapors from. The alloy is named for Barnabas Wood, who first created and patented the alloy in 1860. It is a eutectic, fusible alloy of 50% bismuth, 26.7% lead, 13.3% tin, and 10% cadmium by mass.

Applications 

Wood's metal is useful as a low-melting solder, low-temperature casting metal, high-temperature coupling fluid in heat baths, and as a fire-melted valve element in fire sprinkler systems in buildings. Medical gas cylinders in the United Kingdom have a Wood's metal seal, which melts in fire, allowing the gas to escape and reducing the risk of gas explosion.

Wood's metal is commonly used as a filler when bending thin-walled metal tubes. For this use the tubing is filled with molten Wood's metal. After this filler solidifies, the tubing is bent. The filler prevents the tube collapsing. The Wood's metal is then removed by heating, often by immersion in boiling water.

Other uses include making custom-shaped apertures and blocks (for example, electron-beam cutouts and lung blocks) for medical radiation treatment, making casts of keys that are hard to duplicate otherwise and making metal inlays in wood.

Wood's metal is useful in machine shops and technical laboratories when alternative means of holding delicate parts become necessary.  It is used as an additional hardened layer to allow the proper gripping and machining of an object. The object is immersed in melted Wood's metal to completely or partially coat it, forming a layer from a few millimeters up to few centimeters thick, depending on how the object will be held in place. After cooling, the new assembly is clamped by conventional means. This method is most useful for one-off or limited-production workpieces, when construction of a special clamping or holding jig would neither be cost-effective nor offer maximum holding capability.

Wood's metal is also useful for repairing antiques. For example, a bent piece of sheet metal may be repaired by casting a Wood's metal die from an intact example: The low melting temperature of Wood's metal makes it unlikely to harm the original, and the damaged piece can then be clamped in the die and slowly tightened to form it back into shape.

Wood's metal has long been used by model railroad enthusiasts to add weight to locomotives, increasing traction and the number of cars that can be pulled.

Wood’s metal was used for many years in the 1950’s and 1960’s to make gag flatware spoons as a novelty, and used as a practical joke. Given to an unsuspecting diner, the bowl of the spoon, when immersed in hot coffee or other hot drinks, melted and fell into the liquid, much to the amusement of all.

Wood's metal is also used in the making of extracellular electrodes for the electro-physiological recording of neural activity.

Like other fusible alloys, e.g. Rose's metal, Wood's metal can be used as a heat-transfer medium in hot baths. Hot baths with Rose's and Wood's metals are not in routine use but are employed for temperatures above .

Wood's metal has a modulus of elasticity of 12.7 GPa and a yield strength of 26.2 MPa.

Toxicity 
Wood's metal is toxic because it contains lead and cadmium, and contamination of bare skin is considered harmful. Vapour from cadmium-containing alloys is also known to pose a danger to humans. Cadmium poisoning carries the risk of cancer, anosmia (loss of sense of smell), and damage to the liver, kidneys, nerves, bones, and respiratory system. Field's metal is a non-toxic alternative.

The dust may form flammable mixtures with air.

Related alloys  

Several other alloys with similar low melting points are listed here.

References

Bibliography 
 Birchon's Dictionary of Metallurgy, London, 1965
 Experimental techniques in low-temperature physics, G. K. White, Oxford University Press, Third Edition

External links 

 Making your own low-melting point eutectic: Science Toys: A metal that melts in hot water
 Burdakin et al., "Melting points of gallium and of binary eutectics with gallium", Metrologia, 2008

Fusible alloys